A Lust to Kill is a 1958 American Western film directed by Walter Grauman and starring Jim Davis, Don Megowan, and Allison Hayes. The film is also known as Lust to Kill, A Time to Kill, and Border Lust.

Plot
Cowboy Cheney Holland (Don Megowan) and his brother Luke rob of a load of rifles but later are abandoned by the rest of their gang. The pursuing lawmen, including their former friend Marshal Matt Gordon (Jim Davis), chase the brothers, eventually killing Luke and apprehending Cheney. With his girlfriend Sherri (Allison Hayes) on his side, Cheney Holland escapes and seeks to avenge his younger brother. While Holland chases his previous gang of criminals led by Isaac Stansil (Gerald Milton), Holland is himself pursued by the stubborn Marshal Gordon. Holland eventually catches up with Stancil, killing him. Meanwhile, Gordon apprehends Sherry and uses her to lure Holland; the two meet in a dramatic showdown, and Holland is killed.

Cast

Jim Davis as Matt Gordon
Don Megowan as Cheney Holland
Allison Hayes as Sherry
Gerald Milton as Isaac Stancil
Tom Hubbard as Kane Guthrie
Claire Carleton as Minny
John Holland as McKenzie
Rickie Sorensen as Jeff
James Maloney as Stockton
Robert Williams as Glover
Fred Sherman as Baxter
Tony Turner as Laurie
Sandra Giles as Belle

References

External links

1958 films
1958 Western (genre) films
American Western (genre) films
Films directed by Oliver Drake
1950s English-language films
1950s American films